

Early and personal life
Arienne Dwyer is the daughter of flutist Doriot Anthony Dwyer, and a descendant of women's rights activist Susan B. Anthony.

Career
Arienne Dwyer has been a professor of Linguistic Anthropology in the Department of Anthropology at the University of Kansas since 2001. She is also an affiliate Professor of Linguistics at the University of Washington. In 2010 she co-founded KU's Institute for Digital Research in the Humanities., and co-directed it until 2018.

Dwyer conducts research into the languages and cultures of Inner and Central Asia, especially languages in the Turkic, Sinitic, and  Mongolic families. She earned her PhD in 1996 in Altaic and Chinese Linguistics at the University of Washington, and was a Humboldt postdoctoral research fellow and Volkswagen-DOBES grantee at the Johannes Gutenberg-Universität Mainz. She has also published pedagogical and linguistic materials for the Uyghur language.

Her research is notable in arguing for the areal significance of Chinese Inner Asia as a Sprachbund, a region of language convergence. Her research also looks at issues of language documentation, Open Access and language ideology. In 2014, her work led to her being named a Fellow of the John Simon Guggenheim Memorial Foundation.

Dwyer received NSF funding for and directed Institute on Collaborative Language Research (CoLang 2012), inviting Carlos Nash to be co-director. CoLang is an international training workshop in in situ language documentation supported by the National Science Foundation, convening in even years.

Since 2010, her collaborative work has focused on sharing analyzed language resources, including a pilot website Interactive Inner Asia, which provided some samples of language materials based on Dwyer's VW-DOBES project, and the Uyghur 2.0 website, which includes the Uyghur Light Verbs project (on the diachrony of modern Uyghur complex predicates), and the Analyzing Turki Manuscripts Online (ATMO) project (creating digital editions of late eastern Chaghatay/early modern Uyghur language texts, with a focus on cultural and linguistic analysis of medical manuscripts, and social network analysis).

Selected publications

References

External links
  IAIA: Interactive Inner Asia  
  Uyghur Light Verbs project
  Annotated/Analyzing Turki Manuscripts Online 
 Arienne Dwyer faculty home page at KU
 CoLang 2012 webpage

Linguists from the United States
Women linguists
Living people
Linguists of Turkic languages
University of Kansas faculty
University of Washington alumni
Year of birth missing (living people)